Danny Diaz & The Checkmates were a Filipino rock band, based in Hong Kong in the 1960s.

They were part of the Hong Kong beat group scene between 1964 and 1969, that included other Hong Kong groups, such as Anders Nelson & The Inspiration, D'Topnotes, Fabulous Echoes, Joe Jr. & The Side Effects, Teddy Robin & The Playboys, Lotus, Magic Carpets, Mod East and Mystics and The Thunderbirds. They entered into a "Battle of the Sound" contest and conquered various groups, and in the final beat Teddy Robin & The Playboys to become the winner. Some recordings were released on the Diamond record label. In the late 1960s they covered a song that The Foundations had released, the Eric Allandale composition, "Solomon Grundy".

Singles
"Solomon Grundy" / "Goodbye Baby" – Pye Records 7N.17690
"What Ever Happened to Romance" – Jewel 71387

Compilation albums
Diamond Records Best Selection (Four CD) – Various artists – Universal Music (HK) (2006)
"It's So Easy"
"Up Up And Away"
Krazy World  World Beaters 4 – Various Artists (2005)
"She's So Fine"

References

Chinese rock music groups
Hong Kong musical groups